Perpendicular Point is a small headland on the West Coast of New Zealand's South Island, overlooking the Tasman Sea.  It lies about 40 km south-south-west of Cape Foulwind, close to the small community of Te Miko. Perpendicular Point was known as Te Miko to Māori. A notorious obstacle to coastal travel, the cliffs had ladders built from rātā vine and harakeke, later replaced by chains and rungs, until a reliable inland road was built in the 1860s.

Important Bird Area
The point has been identified as an Important Bird Area, by BirdLife International because the coastal cliffs in its vicinity are a breeding site for over 500 pairs of spotted shags.

References

Buller District
Important Bird Areas of New Zealand
Headlands of the West Coast, New Zealand